The Saturn C-5N was a conceptual successor to the Saturn V launch vehicle which would have had a nuclear thermal third stage instead of the S-IVB used on the Saturn V. This one change would have increased the payload of the standard Saturn V to Low Earth orbit from 118,000 kg to 155,000 kg.

The conceptual Saturn C-5N was designed as an evolutionary successor to the Saturn V, intended for the planned crewed mission to Mars by 1980, it would have cut crewed transit times to Mars to about 4 months, instead of the 8–9 months of chemical rocket engines. However the Mars mission, along with all work related to the evolutionary successors of the Saturn V, was cancelled in 1972-3 by the Nixon Administration.

The ground testing of the Nuclear thermal rocket engines intended for the Saturn C-5N's, in-space 3rd stage, still hold a number of combined rocket thrust and specific impulse records. The concept of nuclear thermal rockets serving as the in-space rocket stage influenced the 1990s Project Timberwind.

See also
NERVA

References

External links
Encyclopedia Astronautica

C5N